MikroTik (officially SIA "Mikrotīkls") is a Latvian network equipment manufacturer. The company develops and sells wired and wireless network routers, network switches, access points, as well as operating systems and auxiliary software. The company was founded in 1996, and as of August 2019, the company website reported an estimated 280 employees. In 2021, with a value of EUR 1.24B, Mikrotik was the 3rd largest company in Latvia and the first private company to surpass EUR 1B value in Latvia.

History 
MikroTik was founded in 1996 by John Tully and Arnis Riekstiņš in Riga, Latvia, developing networking software for x86 PC hardware that would develop into a product called RouterOS. The earliest versions of RouterOS were based on Linux 2.2. In 2002, MikroTik began producing their own networking-focused low-power single-board computers, branded RouterBoard, that ran RouterOS. These early SBCs could be expanded and/or used as components of other systems, but as time passed, this RouterBoard/RouterOS platform would develop into a full line network equipment.

Timeline 
 1997 - Release of software for x86 PC platform, called simply MikroTik Router Software, that would eventually develop into RouterOS. 
 2002 - Release of RouterBoard series PCI add-in boards to be used with MikroTik x86-based PCs running RouterOS.
 2003 - Release of RouterBoard 200, a single-board router platform, and RouterBOARD 220 with the SBC integrated into an enclosure with a 2.4 GHz wireless antenna powered by PoE. Original RouterBoard was based on the Geode CPU, but later used MIPS.
 2012 - Release of Cloud Core Router (CCR) 1000-series, using Tilera's TILE-Gx many-core CPUs. Tilera-base CCRs would eventually be released with up to 72-cores at 1GHz.
 2022 - Release of CCR 2000-series using ARM64-architecture CPUs and featuring 100GbE capability in the CCR2216. Also, a return to PC add-in boards with the CCR2004-1G-2XS-PCIe.

Product vulnerabilities 

 On 23 May 2018, Cisco Talos Intelligence Group reported that some MikroTik devices were found vulnerable to the VPNFilter malware.
 RouterOS through 6.42 allows unauthenticated remote attackers to read arbitrary files and remote authenticated attackers to write arbitrary files due to a directory traversal vulnerability in the WinBox interface.

Meris
Beginning in June 2021, a botnet composed of unprotected Mikrotik devices created huge volumes of application-layer traffic using HTTP pipelining, resulting in DDOS. The net was named Mēris (or Meris) by Qrator. Yandex reported attacks beginning August 4, 2021 (over 5 million requests per second) with a massive attack on 5 September 2021 reaching almost 22 million RPS (requests per second). Cloudflare acknowledged an attack at over 17 million RPS in July 2021.

References

External links 
 Company website 

Companies of Latvia
Telecommunications equipment vendors